The 1958 Bulgarian Cup was the 16th season of the Bulgarian Cup (in this period the tournament was named Cup of the Soviet Army). Spartak Plovdiv won the competition, beating Minyor Pernik 1–0 in the final at the Vasil Levski National Stadium in Sofia.

First round

|-
!colspan="3" style="background-color:#D0F0C0; text-align:left;" |Replay

|}

Second round

|}

Quarter-finals

|}

Semi-finals

|}

Final

Details

References

1957
1957–58 domestic association football cups
Cup